Young Democrats may refer to:

Young Democrats of America
Young Democrats for Europe
Young Democrats (Netherlands)
Young Democrats (Italy)
YCSU Young Democrats (Belarus)
Young Democrats (Germany)

See also
International Young Democrat Union

Political party disambiguation pages